The International Play writing Festival was founded in 1986 by Steve Gooch and Ted Craig and was hosted by the new playwriting theatre, Warehouse Theatre until the Warehouse Theater Company Limited went into administration in May 2012. The Festival acted to ensure its reputation and continuation and is now under the umbrella of a new company, Warehouse Phoenix Limited. The IPF is held in two parts: the first is a competition with entries accepted from all over the world, which are judged by a panel of distinguished theater practitioners. The second is a celebration and a showcase of the selected plays which is performed the following May.

The IPF has two international partners - Extra Candoni, Udine, Italy, and Theatro Ena, Nicosia, Cyprus representing Italian and Greek new writing. There are also contributions from students from the BRIT School - the Performing Arts and Technology School.
"Doing playwrights and the theatre at large a fine service". Jeremy Kingston, The Times 1990.

The 2013 IPF was held at the Fairfield Halls, Croydon on the 29th and 30 June 2013 and the selected play "The Road to Nowhere" by Sean Cook was given a full production at the Aschcroft Theatre in Croydon from 2nd to 5 October 2013.

Writers discovered by the IPF include:
Mark Norfolk - His debut play, Knock Down Ginger was produced at the Warehouse Theatre in June 2002 (the education project attached to the play was nominated for the Arts Council England’s Eclipse award for combating racism through theatre). Knock Down Ginger was also showcased in Urbino, Italy the same year. His second play Wrong Place was I produced by the Soho Theater in October 2003.
Maggie Nevill – The Shagaround was premièred at the Premio Candoni Arta Terme 2001 and co-produced by the Warehouse Theater Company and the Nuffield Theatre, Southampton playing at the Nuffield Theatre, Ashcroft Theatre, Soho Theatre and Theatre Royal, Brighton.
Roumen Shomov – The Dove was premièred at the Warehouse Theatre April 2000 and was also showcased at the Premio Candoni Arta Terme in the same year.  It went on to be produced in Bulgaria at The State Theatre, Yambol and State Satirical Theater, Sofia.
Dominic McHale – The Resurrectionists was co-produced by the Bolton Octagon Theater and the Warehouse Theater in 1998.
Richard Vincent – Real Estate was produced in Italy by Il Centro per la Drammaturgia Contemporanea ‘H’ December 1999, Quartieri dell’Arte and Festival delle Ville Tuscolane July 2001 and Teatro Colosseo December 2001 and has since been developed as a screenplay. Skin Deep was produced at the Warehouse Theatre May 2002.  He has since written for the BBC’s Casualty and several screenplays for the Film Council
Kevin Hood (Silent Witness TV series and the film Becoming Jane).
Guy Jenkin (Drop The Dead Donkey)
Peter Moffat (North Square & Cambridge Spies)

The Festival patron is Thelma Holt CBE.

References 

 internationalplaywritingfestival.com
 warehousephoenix.co.uk

Culture in the London Borough of Croydon
Theatre festivals in England
Festivals in London